The Croatian National Shift ( or HNP) is a minor Croatian political party in Bosnia and Herzegovina.

In the 2020–24 legislative period, HNP has the majority in one canton, Croat-majority Canton 10.

History
HNP was found on 24 June 2020 as an effort led by Ivan Vukadin and other party members to create democratic opposition to HDZ policies in Canton 10.

Elections

Parliamentary Assembly of Bosnia and Herzegovina

Parliament of the Federation of Bosnia and Herzegovina

Presidency elections

Sources

Christian democratic parties in Europe
Political parties established in 2020
Croat political parties in Bosnia and Herzegovina
Political parties of minorities
Conservative parties in Bosnia and Herzegovina